"Poor Fool" is a song written and produced by Ike Turner. It was released by Ike & Tina Turner on Sue Records in 1961.

Release 
"Poor Fool" is the second single from Ike & Tina Turner's 1962 album Dynamite!. An earlier version of the song, "A Fool Too Long," was released in 1960. "Poor Fool" was released as the follow-up to the Grammy nominated single "It's Gonna Work Out Fine" in November 1961. The record became the duo's second hit record of the year. They promoted it on American Bandstand in January 1962 which helped propel the single to No. 38 on the Billboard Hot 100 and No. 4 on the R&B chart. The song was also included in their 1963 album It's Gonna Work Out Fine.

The B-side track "You Can't Blame Me" was taken from their debut album The Soul of Ike & Tina Turner.

Critical reception 
Cash Box (November 18, 1961): Ike & Tina Turner come thru in sensational follow-up (to "It's Gonna Work Out Fine") fashion with this new Sue slice. It's a pounding, chorus-backed rock-a-cha-cha, tabbed "Poor Fool," that vocalist Tina and maestro Ike deck out with sock, dual-mart sales authority. Should spread like wild fire in the days to come. Flip's a fetching thump-a-rhythm entry that highlites a delightful vocal duet by Ike & Tina.

Track listing

Chart performance

Weekly charts

Year-end charts

References 

1961 singles
1961 songs
Ike & Tina Turner songs
Songs written by Ike Turner
Song recordings produced by Ike Turner
Sue Records singles